Marine Medium Tiltrotor Squadron 774 (VMM-774) is a United States Marine Corps medium helicopter squadron consisting of V-22 Osprey transport helicopters. The squadron, known as the "Wild Goose", is a United States Marine Corps Reserve unit based at Marine Corps Air Station New River, North Carolina and falls under the command of Marine Aircraft Group 49 (MAG-49) and the 4th Marine Aircraft Wing (4th MAW).

With the deactivation of training squadron HMMT-164 and re-designation as VMM-164 on April 9, 2015, HMM-774 was the last dedicated CH-46E squadron in the Marine Corps.

Mission
Support the MAGTF Commander by providing assault support transport of combat troops, supplies, and equipment, day or night, under all weather conditions during expeditionary, joint or combined operations.

Maintain combat readiness and provide support to the 4th Marine Aircraft Wing.  Missions include assault support, CASEVAC, helicopter support team training and SEAL team support.

History
Marine Medium Helicopter 774 was activated September 5, 1958, at Naval Air Station New York as Marine Transport Helicopter Squadron 774 (HMR-774). The squadron operated the SH-34G/J Sea Bat helicopter. In April 1962 the squadron was redesignated Marine Medium Helicopter Squadron 774, but was deactivated on 30 September 1962.

HMM-774 was reactivated at Naval Air Station Norfolk (Chambers Field) on July 1, 1969. HMM-774 initially operated UH-34D Sea Horse helicopters. In 1970, the CH-46 replaced the UH-34 and in 1971 the squadron was assigned under the command of the 4th Marine Aircraft Wing. In January 1991, HMM-774 was mobilized as an element of Marine Aircraft Group 26, I Marine Expeditionary Force (I MEF) in support of OPERATIONS DESERT SHIELD and DESERT STORM.  In July 2004, the squadron was mobilized and deployed to Al Asad, Iraq in support of Operation Iraqi Freedom from August 2004 to March 2005 and from September 2005 to March 2006.  The squadron was demobilized during July 2006.

On July 12, 2010, HMM-774 embarked aboard  in support of Continuing Promise 2010. During this humanitarian mission, HMM-774 provided support to numerous countries in South America, to include Haiti, Nicaragua, Panama, Colombia, Guatemala, Suriname and Costa Rica. HMM-774 also played a vital role in the aftermath of Hurricane Thomas while deployed to South America and the Caribbean. Shortly after Hurricane Tomas passed through the Bahamas, HMM-774 pulled out of Suriname in short notice and followed the storm to Haiti. Once Hurricane Tomas made landfall, USS Iwo Jima rushed to the scene. Within hours of Hurricane Tomas' destruction, USS Iwo Jima was on the site and HMM-774 was flying aerial recon to assess the situation and decide if further assistance was required.

The squadron was present for Integrated Training Exercise (ITX) 4-13, providing a portion of the aviation combat element (ACE), as well as the same exercise, 4-14, the following year at Twentynine Palms, California. Following the return from Twentynine Palms in June 2014, the squadron turned attention to preparing for the upcoming transition to the MV-22B Osprey aircraft. As of April 2015, HMM-774 continues to gradually retire aircraft leading to a complete disposition of the CH-46E by December 2015. Retirement of the final aircraft around that time will bring an end to the last dedicated Marine medium helicopter squadron operated by the Marine Corps. HMM-774 became designated as VMM-774 in January 2016 as the squadron received its first V-22 and later took its first test flight in April 2016. VMM-774 declared Final Operating Capability in April 2018 under command of Lt. Col Eric G. Burns.

As of January 2020, VMM-774 no longer maintains any CH-46E aircraft. They have all been retired previously.

In July 2022, VMM-774 completed a move to its current home in Marine Corps Air Station New River North Carolina.

See also

 List of active United States Marine Corps aircraft squadrons
 United States Marine Corps Aviation

Notes
Surpassed 85,000 Mishap-Free Flight Hours

References

Bibliography

Web

 HMM-774's official website
 Unit Blog from Iraq

Military units and formations in Virginia
4th Marine Aircraft Wing
Medium 9F